Anna Negulic (born 20 July 1988) is a Canadian sprint kayaker. She is the current Pan American Games champion in the women's K-4 500 metres, she won gold together with Andréanne Langlois, Alanna Bray-Lougheed, and Alexa Irvin at the 2019 Pan American Games.

References

1998 births
Canadian female canoeists
Canoeists at the 2019 Pan American Games
Living people
People from Bedford, Nova Scotia
Sportspeople from Halifax, Nova Scotia
Pan American Games medalists in canoeing
Pan American Games gold medalists for Canada
Medalists at the 2019 Pan American Games